Tropic Island Hum, released in 2004, but originally recorded in 1987, is a song from Paul McCartney's second animated film for children.  The associated single reached #21 in the UK.

Release
The "Tropic Island Hum" film is from a story and screenplay by Paul McCartney, who with his wife, Linda McCartney, provide all the character's voices. They were also the Executive Producers.

The film was first released theatrically on October 10, 1997. It was subsequently released in 2004 on DVD by Miramax Films as one of the segments of Paul McCartney: Music & Animation. The DVD also includes Rupert & the Frog Song, and Tuesday.

Summary
The film  tells the story of Wirral the Squirrel, who was almost killed by soldiers. Froggo helped him and took him to another place he would go. He couldn't go back there again! But then, he finds a tropical island. Bison is the chief of that island, and Wirral's new love crush is Wilhelmina. Then, all 3 of them (except Wilhelmina) get cleaned up and that night, they perform the theme song to the island. Bison sings the first part of the song. A parrot gets banged on the bass drum and is dizzy. Later, an alligator sings. Right after that, Wirral blushes at his new love crush Wilhelmina. Then a bad thing appears, the mask-animals try to ruin the party, but then, a school appears, and at the end Wirral & Wilhelmina kiss.

Track listing
All songs written by Paul McCartney.

 "Tropic Island Hum" (Radio Edit) – 3:11
 "We All Stand Together" (Single Version) – 3:06

Personnel
 Paul McCartney: lead and backing vocals
 Marion Montgomery: lead vocals
 Unknown musician(s): acoustic guitar, electric guitar, mandolin, double-bass, horns, drums, percussion

References

External links
 

Paul McCartney songs
Songs written by Paul McCartney
Song recordings produced by Paul McCartney
1995 songs
1997 animated films